Dominik Kříž (born 25 September 1999) is a Czech footballer who currently plays as a midfielder for Viktoria Plzeň.

Club career

FC Zbrojovka Brno
He made his professional debut for Zbrojovka Brno in the home match against Jihlava on 22 July 2018, which ended in a loss 1:3.

References

External links
 Profile at FC Zbrojovka Brno official site
 Profile at FAČR official site
 

1999 births
Living people
Czech footballers
Czech expatriate footballers
Czech Republic youth international footballers
Association football midfielders
FC Zbrojovka Brno players
SK Líšeň players
1. FK Příbram players
FC Slavoj Vyšehrad players
FC Viktoria Plzeň players
ŠKF Sereď players
Czech First League players
Czech National Football League players
Slovak Super Liga players
Expatriate footballers in Slovakia
Czech expatriate sportspeople in Slovakia
Footballers from Brno